Babin may refer to:

Places

Bosnia and Herzegovina
 Babin Do, Neum, village in the Neum municipality
 Babin Do, Šipovo, village in the Šipovo municipality
 Babin Potok, Donji Vakuf, village in the Donji Vakuf municipality
 Babin Potok, Višegrad, village in the Višegrad municipality

Poland
 Babin, Gryfino County in West Pomeranian Voivodeship (north-west Poland)
 Babin, Lublin Voivodeship (east Poland)
 Babin, Lower Silesian Voivodeship (south-west Poland)
 Babin, Masovian Voivodeship (east-central Poland)
 Babin, Pyrzyce County in West Pomeranian Voivodeship (north-west Poland)
 Babin, Słupca County in Greater Poland Voivodeship (west-central Poland)
 Babin, Środa Wielkopolska County in Greater Poland Voivodeship (west-central Poland)
 Babin, Szczecin, neighborhood in the city of Szczecin

Slovakia
 Babín, village and municipality

Ukraine
 Babin, the Romanian name for Babyn, Zastavna Raion, Chernivtsi Oblast
 Babin, the Romanian name for Babyne village, Karapchiv, Vyzhnytsia Raion, Chernivtsi Oblast

Other uses
 Babin (surname)
 Vronsky & Babin, Russian piano duo
 Babin Republic, Polish satirical, literary and carnival society founded in 1568

See also
 Babina (disambiguation)